Derbyshire County Cricket Club in 1960 was the  cricket season when the English club Derbyshire had been playing for eighty nine years. It was their fifty-sixth  season in the County Championship and they won ten matches and lost ten to finish eighth in the County Championship.

1960 season

Derbyshire played 28 games in the County Championship, one match against the touring South Africans, one match against Oxford University, and an extra match against Northamptonshire.  They won ten matches, lost ten matches and drew eleven matches. Donald Carr was in his sixth year as captain.  Laurie Johnson was top scorer and Les Jackson took most wickets for the club.

David Millner was the only player to make his first class debut in the Derbyshire team.

Matches

Statistics

County Championship batting averages

G Wyatt kept wicket against Oxford University

County Championship bowling averages

Wicket Keeping
George Dawkes  Catches 69, Stumping 4 
G Wyatt        Catches 2

See also
Derbyshire County Cricket Club seasons
1960 English cricket season

References

1960 in English cricket
Derbyshire County Cricket Club seasons